USS Gladiator was built in 1876 at St. Mary's, Georgia; chartered from the Wilmington Towing Co., Wilmington, North Carolina; commissioned 19 April 1918; and assigned to the 5th Naval District.

Tugboats Swapped with Owner 
On 20 August 1918 the tug Emily B. owned by the same company, was substituted for Gladiator. On 20 December 1918 Gladiator decommissioned and was returned to her owners.

References 

Tugs of the United States Navy
Ships built in Georgia (U.S. state)
1876 ships